Glenn Arne Hansen (born 20 September 1972) is a retired Norwegian football goalkeeper.

After half a year on Langhus's senior team in 1989, he joined the region's prime team Drøbak-Frogn in 1990. He played the 1992 season in Ski, then returned to Drøbak-Frogn.

In March 1996 Hansen was loaned out to Bradford City, trying his luck in reserve matches. However, in late May 1996 the Norwegian top-flight team Strømsgodset was bereft of goalkeepers, and Hansen agreed on a loan to them. He then joined Strømsgodset on a permanent basis, playing there until 2001. He then had a nine-year stint in Follo, staying with them until the 2010 Norwegian Football Cup Final which Follo lost. Hansen then played two seasons for then-second-tier Nesodden, then one season each in Drøbak-Frogn, Nesodden and Langhus before retiring as a 43-year old. He joined Ski's coaching setup and even featured for the club's fifth-tier senior team.

References

1972 births
Living people
People from Ski, Norway
Norwegian footballers
Drøbak-Frogn IL players
Strømsgodset Toppfotball players
Follo FK players
Norwegian First Division players
Eliteserien players
Association football goalkeepers
Norwegian expatriate footballers
Sportspeople from Viken (county)